"Sold (The Grundy County Auction Incident)" is a song written by Richard Fagan and Robb Royer, and recorded by American country music artist John Michael Montgomery.  It was released in May 1995 as the second single from his self-titled album.  It hit number-one on the country charts in the United States and Canada in July 1995. It was named Billboard Hot Country Singles & Tracks' number-one single for 1995.

Critical reception
Deborah Evans Price, of Billboard magazine reviewed the song favorably, saying that it demonstrates Montgomery's "ability to deliver tongue-twisting lyrics in rapid fire fashion."

Chart performance

Year-end charts

Other Recordings
Barbershop quartet OC Times sang an Aaron Dale arrangement.

References

1995 singles
1995 songs
Atlantic Records singles
Billboard Hot Country Songs number-one singles of the year
John Michael Montgomery songs
songs written by Richard Fagan
songs written by Robb Royer